Sergey Sergeyevich Ridzik (born 25 October 1992, Monchegorsk, Murmansk Oblast, Russia) is a Russian freestyle skier. Competing for Independent Olympic Athletes from Russia at the 2018 Winter Olympics, he won a bronze medal in the ski cross. He replicated this success at the 2022 Winter Olympics in Beijing.

Career
Ridzik was an alpine skier but, in 2011, switched to freestyle skiing. He did not qualify for the 2014 Winter Olympics, and after the Olympics was seriously injured and could not compete for several months. On 15 December 2017, he won a World Cup race in Montafon, his only World Cup win by the time of the Olympics.

He subsequently qualified for the 2018 Winter Olympics and made it to the big final, where four athletes competed for the medals. In the finals, Ridzik collided with Kevin Drury, and they both fell. Ridzik stood up and finished third, getting the bronze medal (Drury was subsequently disqualified).

References

Living people
Freestyle skiers at the 2018 Winter Olympics
Freestyle skiers at the 2022 Winter Olympics
Olympic medalists in freestyle skiing
Olympic bronze medalists for Olympic Athletes from Russia
Olympic bronze medalists for the Russian Olympic Committee athletes
Russian male freestyle skiers
1992 births
Olympic freestyle skiers of Russia
Medalists at the 2018 Winter Olympics
Medalists at the 2022 Winter Olympics
People from Monchegorsk
Sportspeople from Murmansk Oblast